BibSonomy is a social bookmarking and publication-sharing system. It aims to integrate the features of bookmarking systems as well as team-oriented publication management. BibSonomy offers users the ability to store and organize their bookmarks and publication entries and supports the integration of different communities and people by offering a social platform for literature exchange.

Both bookmarks and publication entries can be tagged to help structure and re-find information. As the descriptive terms can be freely chosen, the assignment of tags from different users creates a spontaneous, uncontrolled vocabulary: a folksonomy. In BibSonomy, the folksonomy evolves from the participation of research groups, learning communities and individual users, organizing their information needs.

Publication posts in BibSonomy are stored in the BibTeX format. Export in other formats such as EndNote or HTML (e. g. for publication list creation) is possible.

The service was developed by a team of students and scientists from the Institute of Knowledge and Data Engineering, the DMIR group at the University of Würzburg and the L3S Learning Lab Lower Saxony in Hannover and is mainly hosted by the University of Kassel. , the source code of BibSonomy is available under the GNU Lesser General Public License. , the source code of the BibSonomy web application is available under the GNU Affero General Public License.

See also
 List of social bookmarking sites
 Comparison of reference management software

References

 Robert Jäschke,  Andreas Hotho, Christoph Schmitz and Gerd Stumme. Analysis of the Publication Sharing Behaviour in BibSonomy, Proceedings of the Conceptual Structures: Knowledge Architectures for Smart Applications, Springer, 2006
 Dominik Benz, Andreas Hotho, Robert Jäschke, Beate Krause, Folke Mitzlaff, Christoph Schmitz, and Gerd Stumme. The Social Bookmark and Publication Management System BibSonomy, The VLDB Journal 19(6):849-875, 2010.

External links
 Official site

BibTeX
Library 2.0
Social bookmarking
Reference management software

Social bookmarking websites
Social software